OCIS may refer to:

 Optics Classification and Indexing Scheme
 Oxford Centre for Islamic Studies
 Ocean City Intermediate School (of Ocean City School District)